The Senate is the upper house of the bicameral Parliament of Australia, the lower house being the House of Representatives. The composition and powers of the Senate are established in Chapter I of the Constitution of Australia. There are a total of 76 senators: 12 are elected from each of the six Australian states regardless of population and 2 from each of the two autonomous internal Australian territories (the Australian Capital Territory and the Northern Territory). Senators are popularly elected under the single transferable vote system of proportional representation.

Unlike upper houses in other Westminster-style parliamentary systems, the Senate is vested with significant powers, including the capacity to reject all bills, including budget and appropriation bills, initiated by the government in the House of Representatives, making it a distinctive hybrid of British Westminster bicameralism and American-style bicameralism. As a result of proportional representation, the chamber features a multitude of parties vying for power. Since 1981, the governing party or coalition (which needs to maintain the confidence of the lower house) has only had a majority in the Senate from 2005–2007; otherwise, negotiations with other parties and independents have generally been necessary to pass legislation.

Origins and role

The Commonwealth of Australia Constitution Act (Imp.) of 1900 established the Senate as part of the system of Dominion government in newly federated Australia. From a comparative governmental perspective, the Australian Senate exhibits distinctive characteristics. Unlike upper Houses in other Westminster system governments, the Senate is not a vestigial body with limited legislative power. Rather it was intended to play – and does play – an active role in legislation. Rather than being modeled solely after the House of Lords, as the Senate of Canada was, the Australian Senate was in part modeled after the United States Senate, by giving equal representation to each state and equal powers with the lower house. The Constitution intended to give less populous states added voice in a Federal legislature, while also providing for the revising role of an upper house in the Westminster system.

Although the Prime Minister of Australia and Treasurer of Australia, by convention, are members of the House of Representatives (after John Gorton was appointed prime minister in 1968, he resigned from the Senate and was elected to the House), other members of the Cabinet of Australia may come from either house, and the two Houses have almost equal legislative power. As with most upper chambers in bicameral parliaments, the Senate cannot introduce or amend appropriation bills (bills that authorise government expenditure of public revenue) or bills that impose taxation, that role being reserved for the lower house; it can only approve, reject or defer them. That degree of equality between the Senate and House of Representatives reflects the desire of the Constitution's authors to address smaller states' desire for strong powers for the Senate as a way of ensuring that the interests of more populous states as represented in the House of Representatives did not totally dominate the government. The Australian constitution was enacted before the confrontation in 1909 in Britain between the House of Commons and the House of Lords, which ultimately resulted in the restrictions placed on the powers of the House of Lords by the Parliament Acts 1911 and 1949.

In practice, however, most legislation (except for private member's bills) in the Australian Parliament is initiated by the Government, which has control over the lower house. It is then passed to the Senate, which has the opportunity to amend the bill, pass or reject it. In the majority of cases, voting takes place along party lines, although there are occasional conscience votes.

The Senate maintains a number of committees, which engage in a wide variety of inquiries. The results have no direct legislative power, but are valuable forums that raise many points of view that would otherwise not receive government or public notice.

Electoral system
 
The system for electing senators has changed several times since Federation. The original arrangement involved a first-past-the-post and block voting or "winner takes all" system, on a state-by-state basis. This was replaced in 1919 by preferential block voting. Block voting tended to produce landslide majorities and even "wipe-outs". For instance, from 1920 to 1923 the Nationalist Party held all but one of the 36 seats, and from 1947 to 1950, the Australian Labor Party held all but three.

In 1948, single transferable vote with proportional representation on a state-by-state basis became the method for electing senators. At this time the number of senators was expanded from 36 to 60 and it was argued that a move to proportional representation was needed to even up the balance between both major parties in the chamber. The change in voting systems has been described as an "institutional revolution" that has had the effect of limiting the government's ability to control the chamber, as well as helping the rise of Australian minor parties.

The 1984 election saw the introduction of group ticket voting, in order to reduce a high rate of informal voting that arose from the requirement that each candidate be given a preference, and to allow small parties and independent candidates a reasonable chance of winning a seat. This allowed voters to select a single party "Above the Line" to distribute their preferences on their behalf, but voters were still able to vote directly for individual candidates and distribute their own preferences if they wished "Below the Line" by numbering every box.

Group tickets were abolished in advance of the 2016 election in order to avoid undue influence of preference deals amongst parties that were seen as distorting election results and  a form of optional preferential voting was introduced. As a result of the changes, voters may now assign their preferences for parties above the line (numbering as many boxes as they wish), or individual candidates below the line, and are not required to fill all of the boxes. Both above and below the line voting now use optional preferential voting. For above the line, voters are instructed to number at least their first six preferences; however, a "savings provision" is in place to ensure that ballots will still be counted if less than six are given. For below the line, voters are required to number at least their first 12 preferences. Voters are free to continue numbering as many preferences as they like beyond the minimum number specified. Another savings provision allows ballot papers with at least 6 below the line preferences to be formal. The voting changes make it more difficult for new small parties and independent candidates to be elected to the Senate, but also allow a voter to voluntarily "exhaust" preferences — that is, to ensure their vote cannot flow to specific candidates or parties — if none of the voter's candidate preferences are elected.

The changes were subject to a challenge in front of High Court of Australia by sitting South Australian Senator Bob Day of the Family First Party. The senator argued that the changes meant the senators would not be "directly chosen by the people" as required by the constitution. The High Court rejected Day's challenge unanimously, deciding that both above the line and below the line voting were consistent with the constitution.

Ballot paper
The Australian Senate voting paper under the single transferable vote proportional representation system resembles the following example (shown in two parts), which shows the candidates for Victorian senate representation in the 2016 federal election.

To vote correctly, electors must either:
 Vote for at least six parties above the thick black line, by writing the numbers 1-6 in party boxes. Votes with less than six boxes numbered are still admitted to the count through savings provisions.
 Vote for at least twelve candidates below the thick black line, by writing the numbers 1-12 in the individual candidates' boxes. Votes with between six and twelve boxes numbered are still admitted to the count through savings provisions.

Because each state elects six senators at each half-Senate election, the quota for election is only one-seventh or 14.3% (one third or 33.3% for territories, where only two senators are elected). Once a candidate has been elected with votes reaching the quota amount, any votes they receive in addition to this may be distributed to other candidates as preferences, if there are still open seats to fill.

With an odd number of seats in a half-Senate election (3 or 5), 50.1% of the vote wins a majority (2/3) or (3/5).

With an even number of seats in a half-Senate election (6), 57.1% of the vote is needed to win a majority of seats (4/6).

The ungrouped candidates in the far right column do not have a box above the line. Therefore, they can only get a primary (number 1) vote from electors who vote below the line.  For this reason, some independents register as a group, either with other independents or by themselves, such as group B in the above example.

Names of parties can be shown only if the parties are registered, which requires, among other things, a minimum of 500 members.

Order of parties 
The order of parties on the ballot papers and the order of ungrouped candidates are determined by a random ballot conducted by the Electoral Commission.

Deposit 
Candidates, parties and groups pay a deposit of $2,000 per candidate, which is forfeited if they fail to achieve 4% of the primary vote.

Public subsidy 
Candidates, parties and groups earn a public subsidy if they gain at least 4% of the primary vote.  At the 2019 federal election, funding was $2.756 per formal first preference vote.

Membership
Under sections 7 and 8 of the Australian Constitution:
 The Senate must comprise an equal number of senators from each original state,
 each original state shall have at least six senators, and
 the Senate must be elected in a way that is not discriminatory among the states.

These conditions have periodically been the source of debate, and within these conditions, the composition and rules of the Senate have varied significantly since federation.

Size and nexus
Under Section 24 of the Constitution, the number of members of the House of Representatives has to be "as nearly as practicable" double the number of senators.

The reasons for the nexus are twofold: a desire to maintain a constant influence for the smaller states, and maintain a constant balance of the two Houses in the event of a joint sitting after a double dissolution. A referendum in 1967 to eliminate the nexus was rejected.

The size of the Senate has changed over the years. The Constitution originally provided for six senators for each state, resulting in a total of 36 senators.

The Constitution permits the Parliament to increase the number of senators, provided that equal numbers of senators from each original state are maintained; accordingly, in 1948, Senate representation was increased from 6 to 10 senators for each state, increasing the total to 60.

In 1975, the two territories, the Northern Territory and the Australian Capital Territory, were given an entitlement to elect two senators each for the first time, bringing the number to 64. The senators from the Northern Territory also represent constituents from Australia's Indian Ocean Territories (Christmas Island and the Cocos (Keeling) Islands), while the senators from the Australian Capital Territory also represent voters from the Jervis Bay Territory and since 1 July 2016, Norfolk Island.

The latest expansion in Senate numbers took place in 1984, when the number of senators from each state was increased from 10 to 12, resulting in a total of 76 senators.

Term
Senators normally serve fixed six-year terms (from 1 July to 30 June). At most federal elections, the seats of 40 of the 76 senators (half of the 72 senators from the six states and all four of the senators from the territories) are contested, along with the entire House of Representatives; such an election is sometimes known as a half-Senate election. The seats of senators representing states elected at a half-Senate election are not contested at the next election, provided it is a half-Senate election. However, under some circumstances, the entire Senate (and the House of Representatives) is dissolved, in what is known as a double dissolution. Following a double dissolution, half the senators representing states serve terms ending on the third 30 June following the election (two to three years) and the rest serve a five to six-year term. Section 13 of the Constitution requires the Senate to allocate long and short terms amongst its members. The term of senators representing a territory expires at the same time as there is an election for the House of Representatives.

Section 13 of the Constitution requires that in half-Senate elections, the election of State senators shall take place within one year before the places become vacant. The actual election date is determined by the Governor of each State, who acts on the advice of the State Premier. The Governors almost always act on the recommendation of the Governor-General, with the last independent Senate election writ being issued by the Governor of Queensland during the Gair Affair in 1974.

Slightly more than half of the Senate is contested at each general election (half of the 72 state senators, and all four of the territory senators), along with the entire House of Representatives. Except in the case of a double dissolution, senators for the states are elected for fixed terms of six years, commencing on 1 July following the election, and ceasing on 30 June six years later.

The term of the four senators from the territories is not fixed, but is defined by the dates of the general elections for the House of Representatives, the period between which can vary greatly, to a maximum of three years and three months. Territory senators commence their terms on the day that they are elected. Their terms expire the day prior to the following general election day.

While there is no constitutional requirement for the election of senators to take place at the same time as those for members of the House of Representatives, the government usually synchronises the dates of elections for the Senate and House of Representatives. However, because their terms do not coincide, the incoming Parliament will for some time comprise the new House of Representatives and the old Senate, except for the senators representing the territories, until the new senators start their term on the next 1 July.

Following a double dissolution, all 76 senators face re-election. If there is an early House election outside the 12-month period in which Senate elections can occur, the synchronisation of the election will be disrupted, and there can be half-Senate elections without a concurrent House election. The last time this occurred was on 21 November 1970.

Quota size
The number of votes that a candidate must receive to be elected to the senate is referred to as a "quota". The quota is worked out by dividing the number of formal votes by one more than the number of vacancies to be filled and then adding one to the result. The 2019 senate election was a half senate election, so 6 senate vacancies were contested in each state. At this election, the quotas in each state were:

Issues with equal representation
Each state elects the same number of senators, meaning there is equal representation for each of the Australian states, regardless of population, so the Senate, like many upper Houses, does not adhere to the principle of "one vote one value". Tasmania, with a population of around 500,000, elects the same number of senators as New South Wales, which has a population of more than 8 million. Because of this imbalance, governments favoured by the more populous states are occasionally frustrated by the extra power the smaller states have in the Senate, to the degree that former Prime Minister Paul Keating famously referred to the Senate's members as "unrepresentative swill". The proportional election system within each state ensures that the Senate incorporates more political diversity than the lower house, which has historically been a two party body. The elected membership of the Senate more closely reflects the first voting preference of the electorate as a whole than does the composition of the House of Representatives, despite the large discrepancies from state to state in the ratio of voters to senators. This often means that the composition of the Senate is different from that of the House of Representatives, contributing to the Senate's function as a house of review.

With proportional representation, and the small majorities in the Senate compared to the generally larger majorities in the House of Representatives, and the requirement that the number of members of the House be "nearly as practicable" twice that of the Senate, a joint sitting after a double dissolution is more likely than not to lead to a victory for the House over the Senate. When the Senate had an odd number of senators retiring at an election (3 or 5), 51% of the vote would lead to a clear majority of 3 out of 5 per state. With an even number of senators retiring at an election, it takes 57% of the vote to win 4 out of 6 seats, which may be insurmountable. This gives the House an unintended extra advantage in joint sittings but not in ordinary elections, where the Senate may be too evenly balanced to get House legislation through.

The Government does not need the support of the Senate to stay in office; however, the Senate can block or defer supply, an action that precipitated a constitutional crisis in 1975. However, if the governing party does not have a majority in the Senate, it can often find its agenda frustrated in the upper house. This can be the case even when the government has a large majority in the House.

Parties
The overwhelming majority of senators have always been elected as representatives of political parties. Parties which currently have representation in the Senate are:
 The Coalition – Liberal Party of Australia, National Party of Australia, Liberal National Party of Queensland and Country Liberal Party
 Australian Labor Party
 Australian Greens
 Pauline Hanson's One Nation
 United Australia Party
 Jacqui Lambie Network

Other parties that have achieved Senate representation in the past include the Australian Conservatives, Derryn Hinch's Justice Party, Family First Party, Australian Democrats, Palmer United Party, Australian Motoring Enthusiast Party, Nuclear Disarmament Party, Liberal Movement, Liberal Democratic Party and Democratic Labour Party.

Due to the need to obtain votes statewide, independent candidates have difficulty getting elected. The exceptions in recent times have been elected in less populous States — the former Tasmanian Senator Brian Harradine and the former South Australian Senator Nick Xenophon. David Pocock was also elected to represent the ACT at the 2022 election. It is less uncommon for a senator initially elected representing a party to become an independent, most recently in the cases of Senator Lucy Gichuhi not joining the Conservatives following its merger with Family First, Senators Rod Culleton and Fraser Anning resigning from One Nation, and Senator Steve Martin being expelled from the Jacqui Lambie Network.

The Australian Senate serves as a model for some politicians in Canada, particularly in the Western provinces, who wish to reform the Canadian Senate so that it takes a more active legislative role.

There are also small factions in the United Kingdom (both from the right and left) who wish to the see the House of Lords take on a structure similar to that of the Australian Senate.

Casual vacancies

Section 15 of the Constitution provides that a casual vacancy of a State senator shall be filled by the State Parliament. If the previous senator was a member of a particular political party the replacement must come from the same party, but the State Parliament may choose not to fill the vacancy, in which case Section 11 requires the Senate to proceed regardless. If the State Parliament happens to be in recess when the vacancy occurs, the Constitution provides that the State Governor can appoint someone to fill the place until fourteen days after the State Parliament resumes sitting.

Procedure

Work 
The Australian Senate typically sits for 50 to 60 days a year. Most of those days are grouped into 'sitting fortnights' of two four-day weeks. These are in turn arranged in three periods: the autumn sittings, from February to April; the winter sittings, which commence with the delivery of the budget in the House of Representatives on the first sitting day of May and run through to June or July; and the spring sittings, which commence around August and continue until December, and which typically contain the largest number of the year's sitting days.

The senate has a regular schedule that structures its typical working week.

Dealing with legislation
All bills must be passed by a majority in both the House of Representatives and the Senate before they become law. Most bills originate in the House of Representatives, and the great majority are introduced by the government.

The usual procedure is for notice to be given by a government minister the day before the bill is introduced into the Senate. Once introduced the bill goes through several stages of consideration. It is given a first reading, which represents the bill's formal introduction into the chamber.

The first reading is followed by debate on the principle or policy of the bill (the second reading debate). Agreement to the bill in principle is indicated by a second reading, after which the detailed provisions of the bill are considered by one of a number of methods (see below). Bills may also be referred by either House to their specialised standing or select committees. Agreement to the policy and the details is confirmed by a third and final reading. These processes ensure that a bill is systematically considered before being agreed to.
The Senate has detailed rules in its standing orders that govern how a bill is considered at each stage. This process of consideration can vary greatly in the amount of time taken. Consideration of some bills is completed in a single day, while complex or controversial legislation may take months to pass through all stages of Senate scrutiny. The Constitution provides that if the Senate vote is equal, the question shall pass in the negative.

Committees

In addition to the work of the main chamber, the Senate also has a large number of committees which deal with matters referred to them by the Senate. These committees also conduct hearings three times a year in which the government's budget and operations are examined. These are known as estimates hearings. Traditionally dominated by scrutiny of government activities by non-government senators, they provide the opportunity for all senators to ask questions of ministers and public officials. This may occasionally include government senators examining activities of independent publicly funded bodies, or pursuing issues arising from previous governments' terms of office. There is however a convention that senators do not have access to the files and records of previous governments when there has been an election resulting in a change in the party in government. Once a particular inquiry is completed the members of the committee can then produce a report, to be tabled in Parliament, outlining what they have discovered as well as any recommendations that they have produced for the Government to consider.

The ability of the Houses of Parliament to establish committees is referenced in Section 49 of the Constitution, which states, "The powers, privileges, and immunities of the Senate and of the House of Representatives, and of the members and the committees of each House, shall be such as are declared by the Parliament, and until declared shall be those of the Commons House of Parliament of the United Kingdom, and of its members and committees, at the establishment of the Commonwealth."

Parliamentary committees can be given a wide range of powers. One of the most significant powers is the ability to summon people to attend hearings in order to give evidence and submit documents. Anyone who attempts to hinder the work of a Parliamentary committee may be found to be in contempt of Parliament. There are a number of ways that witnesses can be found in contempt, these include; refusing to appear before a committee when summoned, refusing to answer a question during a hearing or to produce a document, or later being found to have lied to or misled a committee. Anyone who attempts to influence a witness may also be found in contempt. Other powers include the ability to meet throughout Australia, to establish subcommittees and to take evidence in both public and private hearings.

Proceedings of committees are considered to have the same legal standing as proceedings of Parliament. They are recorded by Hansard, except for private hearings, and also operate under Parliamentary privilege. Every participant, including committee members and witnesses giving evidence, is protected from being prosecuted under any civil or criminal action for anything they may say during a hearing. Written evidence and documents received by a committee are also protected.

Holding governments to account
One of the functions of the Senate, both directly and through its committees, is to scrutinise government activity. The vigour of this scrutiny has been fuelled for many years by the fact that the party in government has seldom had a majority in the Senate. Whereas in the House of Representatives the government's majority has sometimes limited that chamber's capacity to implement executive scrutiny, the opposition and minor parties have been able to use their Senate numbers as a basis for conducting inquiries into government operations. When the Howard Government won control of the Senate in 2005, it sparked a debate about the effectiveness of the Senate in holding the government of the day accountable for its actions. Government members argued that the Senate continued to be a forum of vigorous debate, and its committees continued to be active. The Opposition leader in the Senate suggested that the government had attenuated the scrutinising activities of the Senate. The Australian Democrats, a minor party which frequently played mediating and negotiating roles in the Senate, expressed concern about a diminished role for the Senate's committees.

Voting
Senators are called upon to vote on matters before the Senate. These votes are called divisions in the case of Senate business, or ballots where the vote is to choose a senator to fill an office of the Senate (such as the President).

Party discipline in Australian politics is strong, so divisions almost always are decided on party lines. Nevertheless, the existence of minor parties holding the balance of power in the Senate has made divisions in that chamber more uncertain than in the House of Representatives.

When a division is to be held, bells ring throughout the parliament building for four minutes, during which time senators must go to the chamber. At the end of that period the doors are locked and a vote is taken, by identifying and counting senators according to the side of the chamber on which they sit (ayes to the right of the chair, noes to the left). The whole procedure takes around eight minutes. Senators with commitments that keep them from the chamber may make arrangements in advance to be 'paired' with a senator of the opposite political party, so that their absence does not affect the outcome of the vote.

The Senate contains an even number of senators, so a tied vote is a real prospect (which regularly occurs when the party numbers in the chamber are finely balanced). Section 23 of the Constitution requires that in the event of a tied division, the question is resolved in the negative. The system is however different for ballots for offices such as the President. If such a ballot is tied, the Clerk of the Senate decides the outcome by the drawing of lots. In reality, conventions govern most ballots, so this situation does not arise.

Political parties and voting outcomes
The extent to which party discipline determines the outcome of parliamentary votes is highlighted by the rarity with which members of the same political party will find themselves on opposing sides of a vote. The exceptions are where a conscience vote is allowed by one or more of the political parties; and occasions where a member of a political party crosses the floor of the chamber to vote against the instructions of their party whip. Crossing the floor very rarely occurs, but is more likely in the Senate than in the House of Representatives.

One feature of the government having a majority in both chambers between 1 July 2005 and the 2007 elections was the potential for an increased emphasis on internal differences between members of the government coalition parties. This period saw the first instances of crossing the floor by senators since the conservative government took office in 1996: Gary Humphries on civil unions in the Australian Capital Territory, and Barnaby Joyce on voluntary student unionism. A more significant potential instance of floor crossing was averted when the government withdrew its Migration Amendment (Designated Unauthorised Arrivals) Bill, of which several government senators had been critical, and which would have been defeated had it proceeded to the vote. The controversy that surrounded these examples demonstrated both the importance of backbenchers in party policy deliberations and the limitations to their power to influence outcomes in the Senate chamber.

In September 2008, Barnaby Joyce became leader of the Nationals in the Senate, and stated that his party in the upper house would no longer necessarily vote with their Liberal counterparts.

Where the Houses disagree

Double dissolutions and joint sittings 
If the Senate rejects or fails to pass a proposed law, or passes it with amendments to which the House of Representatives will not agree, and if after an interval of three months the Senate refuses to pass the same piece of legislation, the government may either abandon the bill or continue to revise it, or, in certain circumstances outlined in section 57 of the Constitution, the Prime Minister can advise the Governor-General to dissolve the entire parliament in a double dissolution. In such an event, the entirety of the Senate faces re-election, as does the House of Representatives, rather than only about half the chamber as is normally the case. After a double dissolution election, if the bills in question are reintroduced, and if they again fail to pass the Senate, the Governor-General may agree to a joint sitting of the two Houses in an attempt to pass the bills. Such a sitting has only occurred once, in 1974.

The double dissolution mechanism is not available for bills that originate in the Senate and are blocked in the lower house.

On 8 October 2003, the then Prime Minister John Howard initiated public discussion of whether the mechanism for the resolution of deadlocks between the Houses should be reformed. High levels of support for the existing mechanism, and a very low level of public interest in that discussion, resulted in the abandonment of these proposals.

Allocating terms after a double dissolution 

After a double dissolution election, section 13 of the Constitution requires the Senate to divide the senators into two classes, with the first class having a three-year "short term", and the second class a six-year "long term". The Senate may adopt any approach it wants to determine how to allocate the long and short terms, however two methods are currently 'on the table':
 "elected-order" method, where the senators elected first attain a six-year term. This approach tends to favour minor party candidates as it gives greater weight to their first preference votes; or
 re-count method, where the long terms are allocated to those senators who would have been elected first if the election had been a standard half-Senate election. This method is likely to be preferred by the major parties in the Senate where it would deliver more six-year terms to their members.

The Senate applied the "elected-order" method following the 1987 double dissolution election. Since that time the Senate has passed resolutions on several occasions indicating its intention to use the re-count method to allocate seats at any future double dissolution, which Green describes as a fairer approach but notes could be ignored if a majority of senators opted for the "elected-order" method instead. In both double dissolution elections since 1987, the "elected order" method was used.

Blocking supply

The constitutional text denies the Senate the power to originate or amend appropriation bills, in deference to the conventions of the classical Westminster system. Under a traditional Westminster system, the executive government is responsible for its use of public funds to the lower house, which has the power to bring down a government by blocking its access to supply – i.e. revenue appropriated through taxation. The arrangement as expressed in the Australian Constitution, however, still leaves the Senate with the power to reject supply bills outright or defer their passage indefinitely – undoubtedly one of the Senate's most powerful abilities. 

This ability is, in part, due to the age of the Australian Constitution as it was written before the Liberal Prime Minister of the United Kingdom, H. H. Asquith, won his confrontation with the House of Lords and passed the Parliament Act of 1911.

The ability to block supply was exercised in the 1975 Australian constitutional crisis. The Opposition used its numbers in the Senate to defer supply bills, refusing to deal with them until an election was called for both Houses of Parliament, an election which it hoped to win. The Prime Minister of the day, Gough Whitlam, contested the legitimacy of the blocking and refused to resign. The crisis brought to a head two Westminster conventions that, under the Australian constitutional system, were in conflict – firstly, that a government may continue to govern for as long as it has the support of the lower house, and secondly, that a government that no longer has access to supply must either resign or be dismissed. The crisis was resolved in November 1975 when Governor-General Sir John Kerr dismissed Whitlam's government and appointed Opposition Leader Fraser as Prime Minister, on the condition that elections for both Houses of parliament be held.

The blocking of supply alone cannot force a double dissolution. There must be legislation repeatedly blocked by the Senate which the government can then choose to use as a trigger for a double dissolution.

Current Senate

2019 election

In the 2019 half-senate election, 40 seats were up for election: six from each state and two from each territory. The senate results were: Liberal/National coalition 19 seats, Labor 13 seats, Greens 6 seats, One Nation 1 seat, and Jacqui Lambie Network 1 seat.

2022 election 

In the 2022 half-senate election, 40 seats were up for election: six from each state and two from each territory. The senate results were: Liberal/National coalition 15 seats (-4), Labor 15 seats (±0), Greens 6 seats (+3), Jacqui Lambie Network 1 seat (+1), One Nation 1 seat (±0), United Australia 1 seat (+1), and independent 1 seat (+1). The composition of the Senate after the election was:

 Liberal/National Coalition 32 seats
Labor 26 seats
Greens 12 seats
Jacqui Lambie Network 2 seats
One Nation 2 seats
United Australia 1 seat
Independent (David Pocock) 1 seat

Historical party composition of the Senate
The Senate has included representatives from a range of political parties, including several parties that have seldom or never had representation in the House of Representatives, but which have consistently secured a small but significant level of electoral support, as the table shows.

Results represent the composition of the Senate after the elections. The full Senate has been contested on eight occasions; the inaugural election and seven double dissolutions. These are underlined and highlighted in puce.

See also
 2019 Australian federal election
 Canberra Press Gallery
 Clerk of the Australian Senate
 Double dissolution
 Father of the Australian Senate
 List of Australian Senate appointments
 Members of the Australian Parliament who have served for at least 30 years
 Members of the Australian Senate, 2019–2022
 Women in the Australian Senate

Notes

References

Further reading 

 
 Harry Evans, Australian Senate Practice, A detailed reference work on all aspects of the Senate's powers, procedures and practices.
 John Halligan, Robin Miller and John Power, Parliament in the Twenty-first Century: Institutional Reform and Emerging Roles, Melbourne University Publishing, 2007.
 
 Wilfried Swenden, Federalism and Second Chambers: Regional Representation in Parliamentary Federations: the Australian Senate and German Bundesrat Compared, P.I.E. Peter Lang, 2004.

External links 

 
 Australian Parliament – live broadcasting
 Senate StatsNet
 The Biographical Dictionary of the Australian Senate
 Australia's Upper Houses - ABC Rear Vision A podcast about the development of Australia's upper houses into STV proportional representation elected chambers.

 
1901 establishments in Australia
Australia
Senate, Australian
Senate, Australian
Westminster system
1975 Australian constitutional crisis